The 2011 Big South Conference baseball tournament was the postseason baseball tournament for the Big South Conference, held from May 24 through 28, 2011, at Gray–Minor Stadium on the campus of the Virginia Military Institute.  The top eight regular season finishers of the ten eligible teams met in the double-elimination tournament.  was not eligible for postseason play in any sport until the 2012–2013 academic year due to its transition to Division I.  Top seeded  won their twelfth championship and earned the conference's automatic bid to the 2011 NCAA Division I baseball tournament.

Seeding
The top eight finishers from the regular season were seeded one through eight.

Bracket

Play-in Round

Double-Elimination

All-Tournament Team
The following players were named to the All-Tournament Team:

Most Valuable Player
Coastal Carolina designated hitter Keith Hardwick was awarded MVP honors with a .429 batting average and 4 RBI in the tournament.

References

Big South Conference Tournament
Big South Conference Baseball Tournament
Big South baseball tournament
Big South Conference baseball tournament